The Lure is a 1914 American silent drama film directed by Alice Guy Blaché starring James O'Neill, Fraunie Fraunholz, Kirah Markham, and Claire Whitney. The Lure was an adaptation of a controversial play by George Scarborough that gives a sympathetic depiction of social pressures leading women into prostitution.

Cast
 James O'Neill
 Fraunie Fraunholz (credited as Fraunie Fraunholtz)
 Kirah Markham
 Claire Whitney
 Wallace Scott
 Bernard Daly
 Lola May
 Lucia Moore

Preservation
With no copies of The Lure listed in any film archives, it is a lost film.

References

External links

1914 films
1914 drama films
Silent American drama films
American films based on plays
Films directed by Alice Guy-Blaché
World Film Company films
American silent feature films
American black-and-white films
1910s American films